Yasmin Sardouk (born 20 May 2000) is a Lebanese footballer who plays as a goalkeeper for Lebanese club ÓBerytus.

Honours
Lebanon
 WAFF Women's Championship third place: 2019

See also
 List of Lebanon women's international footballers

References

External links
 
 

2000 births
Living people
Footballers from Beirut
Lebanese women's footballers
Lebanon women's international footballers
Women's association football goalkeepers
Lebanese Women's Football League players
ÓBerytus players